Andrew David Goodman (born 28 October 1982) is a former New Zealand rugby union player, who played for and captained the Tasman Mako in the National Provincial Championship.

Career
In July 2012, Goodman signed a one year deal with Leinster.

Goodman was educated at Nelson College from 1996 to 2000.  In 1999 and 2000, he was a member of both the school's top rugby team and top cricket team. He then studied physical education and teaching at the University of Otago for five years, before returning to Nelson College as a physical education teacher. In late 2014 he again returned to Nelson after two seasons at Leinster, and accepted a position as head of the rugby academy at Nelson College for 2015.

He is now assistant coach at Leinster.

References

1982 births
Living people
Tasman rugby union players
New Zealand rugby union players
People educated at Nelson College
University of Otago alumni
Rugby union players from Nelson, New Zealand
Leinster Rugby players
Rugby union centres
Mie Honda Heat players
Toyota Industries Shuttles Aichi players